Vyacheslav Ivanovich Trubnikov (25 April 1944 – 18 April 2022) was a Russian journalist, political scientist, intelligence officer, and diplomat. He worked as the Director of Foreign Intelligence Service (Russia) and was a First Deputy of Foreign Minister of Russia.

He graduated from the Moscow State Institute of International Relations in 1967 and started to work for the First Chief Directorate (Foreign Intelligence) of the KGB. From 1971 to 1977, he worked in India under the cover of a correspondent of the RIA Novosti. From 1977 to 1984, he worked in the central office of the First Chief Directorate. From 1984 to 1990, he worked in Bangladesh and India. From 1990 to 1991, he was the chief of the Department of South-East Asia of the KGB. In January 1992, he became the first deputy of the Director of Foreign Intelligence Service (Russia) Yevgeny Primakov. From January 1996 to May 2000, he was Director of the Foreign Intelligence Service. From June 2000 to July 2004, he worked as a first deputy of Foreign Minister of Russia. On 29 July 2004, he was appointed by Vladimir Putin to the post of Ambassador of Russia to India. 

He was a senior network member at the European Leadership Network (ELN).

Trubnikov died on 18 April 2022, at the age of seventy-seven.

References

External links 
Biography 

1944 births
2022 deaths
KGB officers
Directors of the Foreign Intelligence Service (Russia)
Russian journalists
Writers from Irkutsk
Moscow State Institute of International Relations alumni
Ambassador Extraordinary and Plenipotentiary (Russian Federation)
Ambassadors of Russia to India
Heroes of the Russian Federation
Generals of the army (Russia)
Recipients of the Order "For Merit to the Fatherland", 4th class
Recipients of the Order of the Red Star
Recipients of the Order of Francysk Skaryna